Maddan was a legendary king of the Britons as accounted by Geoffrey of Monmouth.  He was the son of King Locrinus and Queen Gwendolen, who both ruled Britain separately.

He was born during the reign of Locrinus but soon after, his grandfather Corineus of Cornwall died and his mother defeated Locrinus in battle.  His mother reigned for the fifteen years of Maddan's adolescence then she abdicated in his favor.  Soon after taking the throne, he married and became the father of Mempricius and Malin.  For forty years he reigned peacefully until his death when civil war broke out between his sons.

Notes

References

Legendary British kings